The feudal barony of Dirleton was a feudal barony with its caput baroniae originally at Castle Tarbet, Elbottle Castle and later at Dirleton Castle in East Lothian, Scotland. The Lordship & Barony of Dirleton lied in East Lothian a few miles west of North Berwick, the land comprising the Caput of the Barony are today only a little over 40 acres, including the Island of Lamb, North and South Dogs in the east coast of Scotland. Its ruined castle, two triangular greens and the buildings are grouped in the traditional style of a medieval township. Dirleton Castle was built in the middle of the twelfth century by a branch of the Anglo-Norman family of De Vaux, a family with its origins in Rouen, Normandy, which had settled in Dirleton during the reign of King Malcolm IV (1153‒1165). The original castle was modelled on contemporary French castles, in particular Coucy la Chateaux north of Paris. Dirleton Castle was defended against the invading army of Edward I of England in June 1298, but eventually fell to Anthony Beck, the fighting Bishop of Durham. In 1311 the castle was recaptured by the Scots and Robert the Bruce ordered that it be reduced to eliminate the possibility of it being occupied by the English in the future. Dirleton was in the hands of the De Vaux family for about two centuries.

John Haliburton, second son of Sir Adam Haliburton, married the daughter and co-heiress of William de Vaux, Lord of Dirleton. One of the first things he did was to order the reconstruction of the castle of Dirleton. John was later killed at the battle of Nisbet in 1355, a battle between the English forces from Morham Castle on the Tweed and local landowners including Halyburton. Haliburton’s son John inherited Dirleton and from around 1382 is known as Sir John Haliburton of Dirleton. Sir John married Margaret, daughter of Sir John Cameron of Ballegarno and the couple had three children, the eldest, Walter, being the heir to the lands and title. Walter Haliburton of Dirleton appears in various charters dating from the reign of Robert III. This Walter married Isobel, daughter of the Duke of Albany. Their son, Sir Walter Haliburton of Dirleton, was a hostage in England on behalf of King James I. In 1403 he married Mary, daughter of Archibald the third Earl of Douglas, and widow of David, Duke of Rothesay the eldest son of King Robert III. In 1438 he was appointed Lord High Treasurer of Scotland, and in 1441 was created Lord Dirleton or Halyburton of Dirleton. The couple had several children of whom John, the eldest, succeeded by 1447. This John, Lord Haliburton, was appointed Sheriff of Berwick. He married Janet, sister of Lord Seton, and they had two sons Patrick and George. Patrick duly became the second Lord Haliburton of Dirleton. He was granted a charter of the Barony of Dirleton in 1451, and another of the dominical lands of the said barony and castle in 1452. On his death in 1459 the land and titles went to his brother George. George, the third Lord Haliburton of Dirleton, had a wife named Mariota and three sons. The eldest Archibald had a charter of Dirleton but he is thought to have been killed, along with his father, at the battle of Sauchie on 11 June 1488. He and his wife were the parents of James who then became the fourth Lord Haliburton of Dirleton. Lord James died unmarried in 1503 and was succeeded by his uncle Patrick. Patrick, fifth Lord Haliburton of Dirleton, had three daughters by his first wife Margaret Douglas, and on his death the title and lands passed to their daughter Janet. Janet, Baroness Haliburton of Dirleton, married William second Lord Ruthven, and when she died around 1560 the titles fell to her son Patrick, the third Lord Ruthven. Patrick was implicated in the murder of David Rizzio, the favourite of Mary, Queen of Scots, in 1566. Patrick’s son William, Lord Ruthven and Dirleton, was created Earl of Gowrie in 1581 but was attainted and subsequently executed in 1582, and all honours forfeited. In 1586 his son James was restored to all honours, including the Barony of Dirleton, but when he was found guilty of treason through his part in the Gowrie Conspiracy the honours were again forfeited. The Ruthven Raid or Conspiracy was an attempt by a group of disaffected noblemen led by William Ruthven to replace the government of Arran-Lennox with one more favourable to the Reformers, and to kidnap the king.

During the Ruthven period various additions were made to the castle, some of which can still be seen. In particular they added the Ruthven Range, the stables, a beehive shaped doocot, and a surrounding barmkin wall. The Ruthvens also created a formal garden which can still be viewed. A feature today is the long herbaceous border measuring 215 metres, and containing around 300 different types of plant.

The estate was then granted to Thomas Erskine of Gogar, as a reward for saving the life of King James VI during the assassination attempt known as the Gowrie Conspiracy. In 1601 Thomas Kellie became a Privy Councillor, and in 1604, by then a knight and Prefect of the Royal Guard, was created him Baron Erskine of Dirleton. He accompanied the king to England and became captain of the Yeoman of the Guard, an office he held until 1632. Thomas Erskine, Lord Dirleton, became Viscount of Fenton in 1606, by 1610 he held a charter of novodamus of Dirleton and other lands, and on 12 March 1619 he was created Earl of Kellie. In 1625 he sold it to Sir James Douglas.

In 1631 James Maxwell acquired the estate. James Maxwell was the third son of Robert Maxwell of Kirkhouse and Crustanes. As a young man he was a member of the Royal Household of King James VI of Scotland, later King James I of England. On 4 June 1631 he was granted a charter of the lands and barony of Fenton, Dirleton, and others, including the lands of Kingston and Elbotle, and had Dirleton erected into a burgh of barony. He, and some colleagues, were also granted a charter granting the right of trading on the west coast of Africa; presumably he was a partner in the Scottish Guinea Company of that period. On 27 March 1646 as James Maxwell of Dirleton he made a tailzie of certain lands, failing male heirs of his own body, on the second, third, fourth, and eldest sons of his eldest daughter Elizabeth by her husband William, Duke of Hamilton, whom failing, on James Maxwell alias Cecil, second son of Viscount Cranbourne, husband of Diana, the granter’s second daughter, he taking the surname and arms of Maxwell. In 1674 this James was Earl of Salisbury. James Maxwell married Elizabeth Buson de Podolsko, and they had two daughters Elizabeth, and Diana. Elizabeth married (1) William, Duke of Hamilton, and (2) Thomas Dalmahoy of that Ilk. Diana married Charles Cecil, Viscount Cranbourne, son of William, Earl of Salisbury. James Maxwell was succeeded by his second daughter Diana and her son James became Lord Salisbury on the death of his grandfather. In late 1646 James Maxwell had been created Earl of Dirleton, Lord Kingston and Elbotle. On his death in 1650 the property fell to his grandson James who sold Dirleton to Sir Robert Fletcher in 1658 and he sold it to Sir John Nisbet in 1663. It was during the reign of the Maxwells that Dirleton Castle was besieged and severely damaged by the Cromwellian Army in 1651.

In 1687 Sir John Nisbet of Dirleton bequeathed the property to his cousin William Nisbet, (1666-1724), son of Alexander Nisbet of Craigtinnie. William married (1) Jean, daughter of Sir William Bennet of Grubett, and (2) Jean, daughter of Robert Bennett, Dean of the Faculty of Advocates. His son William then succeeded and on his death in 1733, Dirleton passed to his son William, a staunch Jacobite. In 1747 William married Mary, daughter and heiress of Alexander Hamilton of Pencaitland, and heiress of Lord Belhaven. On 12 January 1784 William Nisbet was served heir to his father William, who had died in March 1783, in the barony of Dirleton with its fortalice, also in Fentontower, and others in East Lothian, later in March 1784 he was also served as heir to the barony of Grubbet in Roxburghshire. William, (1747-1822), an army officer, married Mary Manners, daughter of Lord Robert Manners, and grand-daughter of the Duke of Rutland. Their only child, Mary, (1777-1855), married (1) Thomas Bruce, Earl of Elgin and Kincardine in 1799, and (2) Robert Ferguson of Raith in 1808. Lady Mary accompanied Lord Elgin on his travels around 1800 when he collected the ‘Elgin Marbles’. Mary Hamilton Nisbet or Ferguson of Raith, was served as heir to her father William Hamilton Nisbet, who died on 17 July 1822, on 6 November 1822. Lady Lucy Bruce, child of the first marriage, inherited Dirleton. She married John Grant of Kilgraston in 1828, and their son Charles Thomas Constantine Grant of Kilgraston duly inherited the title and property. He married Janet Matilda Hay, daughter of William Hay of Duns Castle, Berwickshire, and on their deaths they were succeeded by their son Lieutenant Colonel John Patrick Hamilton Grant of Biel, East Lothian.

The Barony was bequeathed for favour and affection to the present Baron in 2002, by Patrick Hannigan of Salvador, Bahia, Brazil, and it was re-erected on behalf of the Crown by the Registers of Scotland on 22 April 2002, favour of  Present Baron of Dirleton and his heirs.

The Baron is married to The Baroness Rosemary Louzada-Pereira of Fulwood and Dirleton. The Baron and Baroness of Fulwood and Dirleton,  reside between Portugal and Kirkclaugh House in Scotland.  The Baron Fulwood is  a Patron of The Royal Academy of Arts in London, The Nelson Mandela Metropolitan Museum in South Africa, an Art merchant and farmer, he has  authored and published several books.

Citations

References
Whitaker, J & Sons: Whitaker's Peerage: Being a Directory of Titled Persons 1905.

East Lothian
Baronies in the Baronage of Scotland